Ambialet is a commune of the Tarn department in southern France.

Ambialet's castle was a stronghold of the Cathars and was sacked during the Middle Ages by Simon de Montfort. It is also home to a study abroad campus of Saint Francis University, Loretto, Pennsylvania. Classes are held in the centuries-old former Franciscan Monastery in Ambialet, and during visits to Barcelona, Spain and Paris, France. All classes are taught in English.

See also
Communes of the Tarn department

References

Communes of Tarn (department)